Oil reserves in Kuwait make up 8% of the oil reserves in the world. Most of Kuwait's oil reserves are located in the  Burgan field, the second largest conventional oil field in the world, which has been producing oil since 1938. Since most of Kuwait's major oil fields are over 60 years old, maintaining production rates is becoming a problem. 

During Operation Desert Storm when the Iraqi Armed Forces were retreating from Kuwait, Saddam Hussein ordered a team of engineers to enact a scorched earth policy and set fire to hundreds of oil fields which caused over one billion barrels of oil to go up in flames over the next seven months. At their height, the fires consumed more than four million barrels of oil per day.

See also

References

 
Geology of Kuwait
Kuwait